Feodosiya or Praskovia Mikhailovna Solovaya (died 1621), was a Russian noblewoman, Tsesarevna of Russia as the second spouse of Tsarevich Ivan Ivanovich of Russia, son of Ivan the Terrible.

She was the daughter of Mikhail Timofeevich Petrov, a nobleman from the Ryazan region, and belonged to the noble clan later known as Petrovo-Solovovo.  In 1574, she was selected by the tsar to marry his son.  As she was childless, Ivan the Terrible forced their divorce (in 1579) and had her taken monastic vows in the Intercession Convent of Suzdal.

References

 Панова Т.Д. Погребения на территории Кремля. 196. Некрополи Московского Кремля. Руссист (2003). Проверено 27 марта 2011. Архивировано 6 июля 2012 года.

16th-century Russian people
1621 deaths